Craig Charles Dundas (born 16 February 1981) is an English footballer, who is currently player/fitness coach at Sutton United. He plays as a forward.

Career
Dundas began his career at Croydon, spending six years in the first team before moving on to Dulwich Hamlet and then Carshalton Athletic. He started his first spell with Sutton United in 2007, moving to Hampton & Richmond Borough two years later before returning to Sutton after a season. Dundas then spent eight seasons with Sutton, including a brief loan spell with Tonbridge Angels at the start of the 2016-17 season. He returned to Hampton & Richmond at the start of the 2018-19 season, but briefly returned to Sutton in November before returning to the Beveree the following month. He then went back to Sutton for a fourth spell at the end of the season. Dundas made his English Football League debut on 11 September 2021 against Stevenage at the age of 40, becoming the oldest player to make their EFL debut since the Second World War.

References

1981 births
Living people
English footballers
Association football forwards
Croydon F.C. players
APEP FC players 
Dulwich Hamlet F.C. players
Carshalton Athletic F.C. players
Sutton United F.C. players
Hampton & Richmond Borough F.C. players
Tonbridge Angels F.C. players
English Football League players
National League (English football) players
Isthmian League players
Expatriate footballers in Cyprus